A list of films produced in Pakistan in 1972 (see 1972 in film) and in the Urdu language:

1972

See also
1972 in Pakistan

External links
 Search Pakistani film - IMDB.com

1972
Pakistani
Films